The floppy disk is a data storage and transfer medium that was ubiquitous from the mid-1970s well into the 2000s. Besides the 3½-inch and 5¼-inch formats used in IBM PC compatible systems, or the 8-inch format that preceded them, many proprietary floppy disk formats were developed, either using a different disk design or special layout and encoding methods for the data held on the disk.

Non-standard media and devices

IBM DemiDiskette 

In the early 1980s, IBM Rochester developed a 4-inch floppy disk drive, the Model 341 and an associated diskette, the DemiDiskette. At about half the size of the original 8-inch floppy disk the name derived from the prefix demi for "half". This program was driven by aggressive cost goals, but missed the pulse of the industry. The prospective users, both inside and outside IBM, preferred standardization to what by release time were small cost reductions, and were unwilling to retool packaging, interface chips and applications for a proprietary design. The product was announced and withdrawn in 1983 with only a few units shipped. IBM wrote off several hundred million dollars of development and manufacturing facility. IBM obtained patent number  on the media and the drive for the DemiDiskette.

Tabor Drivette 

Another unsuccessful diskette variant was the Drivette, a 3¼-inch diskette drive marketed by Tabor Corporation of Westland, Massachusetts, USA between 1983 and 1985 with media supplied by Dysan, Brown and 3M. The diskettes were named Dysan 3¼" Flex Diskette (P/N 802950), Tabor 3¼" Flex Diskette (P/N D3251), sometimes also nicknamed "Tabor" or "Brown" at tradeshows. The Microfloppy Disk Drive TC 500 was a single-sided quad-density drive with a nominal storage capacity of 500 KB (80 tracks, 140 tpi, 16 sectors, 300 rpm, 250 kbit/s, 9,250 bpi with MFM). It could work with standard controllers for 5¼-inch floppy disks. Since August 1984, it was used in the Seequa Chameleon 325, an early CP/M-80 & MS-DOS portable computer with both Z80 and 8088 processors. It was also offered in limited quantity with some PDP-11/23-based workstations by General Scientific Corporation. Originally, Educational Microcomputer Systems (EMS) announced a system using this drive as well, but later changed plans to use 3½-inch diskette drives instead.

3-inch "MCD-1 Micro Cassette" 

In 1982, such a product, the 3-inch MCD-1 was announced internationally and Jack Tramiel showed interest in using the technology in his Commodore computers, but negotiations fell through. Versions of the floppy drive was released in minimal quantity for the ZX Spectrum and Commodore 64, and some computers made in East Germany were also equipped with one. The floppies are single sided and can hold up to 149 KB of data when MFM formatted. The drives were compatible with contemporary floppy controllers. Production was very limited in the early 1980s due to manufacturing problems and the product was abandoned by 1984 after the industry adopted a standard 3.5 inch format.

3-inch "Compact Floppy Disk" / "CF-2" format 

The 3-inch "Compact Floppy Disk" or "CF-2" was an intended rival to Sony's 3.5" floppy system introduced by a consortium of manufacturers led by Matsushita. Hitachi was a manufacturer of 3-inch disk drives, and stated in advertisements, "It's clear that the 3" floppy will become the new standard."

The format was widely used by Amstrad in their CPC and PCW computers, and (after Amstrad took over manufacture of the line) the Sinclair ZX Spectrum +3. It was also adopted by some other manufacturers/systems such as Sega, the Tatung Einstein, and Timex of Portugal in the FDD and FDD-3000 disk drives. Despite this, the format was not a major success.

Three-inch diskettes bear much similarity to the -inch size, but with some unique features.  One example is the more elongated plastic casing, taller than a -inch disk, but less wide and thicker (i.e. with increased depth). The actual 3-inch magnetic-coated disk occupies less than 50% of the space inside the casing, the rest being used by the complex protection and sealing mechanisms implemented on the disks, which thus are largely responsible for the thickness, length, and relatively high costs of the disks. On the early Amstrad machines (the CPC line and the PCW 8256), the disks are typically flipped over to change the side (acting like 2 separate single-sided disks, comparable to the "flippy disks" of -inch media) as opposed to being contiguously double-sided. Double-sided mechanisms were introduced on the later PCW 8512 and PCW 9512, thus removing the need to remove, flip, and then reinsert the disk.

Quick Disk variants 

Mitsumi marketed several 3-inch diskette "Quick Disk" formats for OEM use. They used 2.8-inch magnetic discs. The OEM could decide on the outer case of the media which led to several mechanically incompatible solutions:

Famicom Disk System
The Japanese Nintendo Famicom Disk System used proprietary 3-inch diskettes called "Disk Cards" between 1986 and 1990.

Smith Corona DataDisk 

Many Smith Corona "CoronaPrint" word-processor typewriters used a proprietary double-sided 3-inch diskette format named "DataDisk". Confusingly, it was labelled 2.8-inch reflecting the diameter of the magnetic disk itself rather than the media's case.

Sharp 2.5-inch floppy disk 
In 1986, Sharp introduced a 2.5-inch floppy disk format for use with their family of BASIC pocket computers. Two drives were produced: the Sharp CE-1600F and the CE-140F (chassis: FDU-250). Both took  turnable diskettes named CE-1650F with a total capacity of 2×64 KB (128 KB) at  bytes per side (512 byte sectors, 8 sectors/track, 16 tracks (00..15), 48 tpi, 250 kbit/s, 270 rpm with GCR (4/5) recording).

2-inch floppy disks 

At least two incompatible floppy disks measuring two inches appeared in the 1980s.

One of these, officially referred to as a Video Floppy (or VF for short) can be used to store video information for still video cameras such as the original Sony Mavica (not to be confused with later Digital Mavica models) and the Ion and Xapshot cameras from Canon. VF is not a digital data format; each track on the disk stores one video field in the analog interlaced composite video format in either the North American NTSC or European PAL standard. This yields a capacity of 25 images per disk in frame mode and 50 in field mode.

Another 2-inch format, the LT-1, is digitally formatted—720 kB, 245 TPI, 80 tracks/side, double-sided, double-density. They are used exclusively in the Zenith MinisPORT laptop computer circa 1989. Although the media exhibited nearly identical performance to the 3½-inch disks of the time, they were not very successful. This was due in part to the scarcity of other devices using this drive making it impractical for software transfer, and high media cost which was much more than 3½-inch and 5¼-inch disks of the time.

Much later, another 2-inch (case size: 54.5 mm × 50.2 mm × 2.0 mm) miniature disk format was Iomega's PocketZip (originally named Clik!), introduced in 1999. The disks could store 40 MB. The external drives were available as PC Card Type II and with USB interface.

Extended use cases

Flippy disks 

A flippy disk (sometimes known as a "flippy") is a double-sided -inch floppy disk, specially modified so that the two sides can be used independently (but not simultaneously) in single-sided drives. Many commercial publishers of computer software (mainly, relatively small programs like arcade games that could fit on a single-sided floppy disk) distributed their products on flippy disks formatted for two different brands of computer, e.g. TRS-80 on one side and Apple on the other. Compute! published an article on the topic in March 1981.

Generally, there are two levels of modifications:
 
 For Disk Operating Systems that do not use the index hole in the disk to mark the beginnings of tracks, the "flippy" modification required only a new write-enable notch to be cut if the disk was designed to be written to. For this purpose, specially designed single-rectangular-hole punchers, commonly known as disk doublers, were produced and sold by third-party computer accessory manufacturers. Many users, however, made do with a standard (round) hole puncher and/or an ordinary pair of scissors for this job. 
 For disk operating systems that do use index sync, a second index hole window has to be punched in both sides of the jacket, and for hard-sectored formats, an additional window must be punched for the sector holes. While cutting a second notch is relatively safe, cutting an additional window into the jacket is a great peril to the disk itself.

A number of floppy-disk manufacturers produced ready-made "flippy" media. As the cost of media went down and double-sided drives became the standard, "flippies" became obsolete.

Auto-loaders 
IBM developed, and several companies copied, an autoloader mechanism that can load a stack of floppies one at a time into a drive. These are very bulky systems, and suffer from media hangups and chew-ups more than standard drives,  but they were a partial answer to replication and large removable storage needs. The smaller 5¼- and 3½-inch floppies made this a much easier technology to perfect.

Floppy mass storage 
A number of companies, including IBM and Burroughs, experimented with using large numbers of unenclosed disks to create massive amounts of storage. The Burroughs system uses a stack of 256 12-inch disks, spinning at a high speed. The disk to be accessed is selected by using air jets to part the stack, and then a pair of heads flies over the surface as in some hard disk drives. This approach in some ways anticipated the Bernoulli disk technology implemented in the Iomega Bernoulli Box, but head crashes or air failures were spectacularly messy. The program did not reach production.

Standard floppy replacements 
A number of attempts were made by various companies to introduce newer floppy-disk formats based on the standard 3½-inch physical format. Most of these systems provide the ability to read and write standard DD and HD disks, while at the same time introducing a much higher-capacity format as well. None of these ever reached the point where it could be assumed that every current PC would have one, and they have now largely been replaced by optical disc burners and flash storage. Nevertheless, the 5¼- and 3½-inch sizes remain to this day as the standards for drive bays in computer cases, the former used for optical drives (including Blu-ray), and the latter for hard disk drives.

The main technological change for the higher-capacity formats was the addition of tracking information on the disk surface to allow the read/write heads to be positioned more accurately. Normal disks have no such information, so the drives use feedforward (blind) positioning by a stepper motor in order to position their heads over the desired track. For good interoperability of disks among drives, this requires precise alignment of the drive heads to a reference standard, somewhat similar to the alignment required to get the best performance out of an audio tape deck. The newer systems generally use position information on the surfaces of the disk to find the tracks, allowing the track width to be greatly reduced.

In 1990, an attempt was made to standardize details for a 20 megabyte 3½-inch format floppy. At the time, "three different technologies that are not interchangeable" existed. One major goal was that the to-be-developed standard drive be backward compatible: that it be able to read 720 KB and 1.44 MB floppies.

From a conceptual point of view, superfloppies are treated as unpartitioned media. The entire media forms a single volume.

Flextra 
As early as 1987, Brier Technology announced the Flextra BR3020, which boasts 21.4 MB (a value used for marketing: its true size is 21,040 kB, 2 sides × 526 cylinders × 40 sectors × 512 bytes or 25 MB unformatted).

Around 1990, it announced the BR3225 drive, which was supposed to double the capacity and also read standard DD, HD and ED 3½-inch disks. However, the drive was still not released in 1992.

It uses 3½-inch standard disk jackets whose disks have low-frequency magnetic servo information embedded on them for use with the 
Twin-Tier Tracking technology. Media were manufactured by Verbatim. Quantum sold the drives under the QuadFlextra name.

Floptical 

In 1991, Insite Peripherals introduced the "Floptical", which uses an infra-red LED to position the heads over marks in the disk surface. The original drive stores 21 MB, while also reading and writing standard DD and HD floppies. In order to improve data transfer speeds and make the high-capacity drive usefully quick as well, the drives are attached to the system using a SCSI connector instead of the normal floppy controller.  This meant that most PCs were unable to boot from them. This again adversely affected pickup rates.

Insite licensed their technology to a number of companies, who introduced compatible devices as well as even larger-capacity formats. The most popular of these, by far, was the LS-120, mentioned below.

Zip drive 

In 1994, Iomega introduced the Zip drive. Although neither size (the original or the later Pocket Zip drive) conforms to the 3½-inch form factor and hence is not compatible with standard 1.44 MB drives, the original physical size still became the most popular of the "super floppies". The first version boasted 100 MB; later versions boasted 250 MB and then 750 MB of storage, until the PocketZip (formerly known as Clik!) was developed with 40 MB. Though Zip drives gained in popularity for several years they never reached the same market penetration as standard floppy drives, since only some new computers were sold with the drives.

The rise of desktop publishing and computer graphics led to much larger file sizes. Zip disks greatly eased the exchange of files that were too big to fit on a standard 3.5-inch floppy or an email attachment, when there was no high-speed connection to transfer the file to the recipient. Eventually the falling prices of compact disc optical media and, later, flash storage, along with notorious hardware failures (the so-called "click of death"), reduced the popularity of the Zip drive.

LS-120/LS-240 

Announced in 1995, the "SuperDisk" marketed as the LS-120 drive, often seen with the brand names Matsushita (Panasonic) and Imation, had an initial capacity of 120 MB (120.375 MB).

LS in this case stands for LASER-servo, which uses a very low-power superluminescent LED that generates light with a small focal spot. This allows the drive to align its rotation to precisely the same point each time, allowing far more data to be written due to the absence of conventional magnetic alignment marks.  The alignment is based on hard-coded optical alignment marks, which meant that a complete format can safely be done.  This worked very well at the time and as a result failures associated with magnetic fields wiping the Zip drive alignment Z tracks were less of a problem. It was also able to read and write to standard floppy disks about 5 times as fast as standard floppy drives.

It was upgraded (as the "LS-240") to 240 MB (240.75 MB). Not only can the drive read and write 1,440 kB disks, but the last versions of the drives can write 32 MB onto a normal 1,440 kB disk.  Unfortunately, popular opinion held the Super Disks to be quite unreliable, though no more so than the Zip drives and SyQuest Technology offerings of the same period and there were also many reported problems moving standard floppies between LS-120 drives and normal floppy drives. This belief, true or otherwise, crippled adoption. The BIOS of many motherboards even to this day supports LS-120 drives as a boot option.

LS-120 drives were available as options on many computers, including desktop and notebook computers from Compaq Computer Corporation. In the case of the Compaq notebooks, the LS-120 drive replaced the standard floppy drive in a multibay configuration.

Sony HiFD 

Sony introduced its own floptical-like system in 1997 as the "150 MB Sony HiFD" which was originally supposed to hold 150 MB (157.3 decimal megabytes) of data. Although by this time the LS-120 had already garnered some market penetration, industry observers nevertheless confidently predicted the HiFD would be the real standard-floppy-killer and finally replace standard floppies in all machines.

After only a short time on the market the product was pulled, as it was discovered there were a number of performance- and reliability problems that made the system essentially unusable. Sony then reengineered the device for a quick rerelease, but then extended the delay well into 1998 instead, and increased the capacity to "200 MB" (approximately 210 decimal megabytes) while they were at it. By this point the market was already saturated by the Zip disk, so it never gained much market share.

Caleb Technology’s UHD144 

The UHD144 drive surfaced early in 1998 as the it drive, and provides 144 MB of storage while also being compatible with the standard 1.44 MB floppies.  The drive was slower than its competitors but the media was cheaper, running about US$8 at introduction and US$5 soon after.

Custom formatting types on 3½-inch and 5¼-inch media

Commodore 64/128 
Commodore started its tradition of special disk formats with the 5¼-inch disk drives accompanying its PET/CBM, VIC-20 and Commodore 64 home computers, the same as the 1540 and 1541 drives used with the later two machines. The standard Commodore Group Coded Recording (GCR) scheme used in 1541 and compatibles employed four different data rates depending upon track position (see zone bit recording). Tracks 1 to 17 had 21 sectors, 18 to 24 had 19, 25 to 30 had 18, and 31 to 35 had 17, for a disk capacity of 170.75 KB (175 decimal kB). Unique among personal computer architectures, the operating system on the computer itself is unaware of the details of the disk and filesystem; disk operations are handled by Commodore DOS instead, which was implemented with an extra MOS-6502 processor on the disk drive. Many programs such as GEOS bypass Commodore's DOS completely, and replace it with fast-loading (for the time) programs in the 1541 drive.

Eventually Commodore gave in to disk format standardization, and made its last 5¼-inch drives, the 1570 and 1571, compatible with Modified Frequency Modulation (MFM), to enable the Commodore 128 to work with CP/M disks from several vendors. Equipped with one of these drives, the C128 is able to access both C64 and CP/M disks, as it needs to, as well as MS-DOS disks (using third-party software), which was a crucial feature for some office work. At least one commercial program, Big Blue Reader by SOGWAP software was available to perform the task.

Commodore also developed a 3½-inch 800 KB disk format for its 8-bit machines with the 1581 disk drive, which uses only MFM.

The GEOS operating system uses a disk format that is largely identical to the Commodore DOS format with a few minor extensions; while generally compatible with standard Commodore disks, certain disk maintenance operations can corrupt the filesystem without proper supervision from the GEOS kernel.

Atari 8-bit line 
The combination of DOS and hardware (810, 1050 and XF551 disk drives) for Atari 8-bit floppy usage allows sectors numbered from 1 to 720 (1040 in the 1050 disk drive, 1440 in XF551). For instance, the DOS's 2.0 disk bitmap provides information on sector allocation, counts from 0 to 719. As a result, sector 720 cannot be written to by the DOS. Some companies used a copy-protection scheme where hidden data was put in sector 720 that cannot be copied through the DOS copy option. Another more-common early copy-protected scheme simply does not record important sectors as allocated in the VTOC, so the DOS Utility Package (DUP) does not duplicate them. All of these early techniques were thwarted by the first program that simply duplicated all sectors.

Later DOS versions (3.0 and later 2.5) and DOSes by third parties (i.e. OSS) accept (and format) disks with up to 1040 sectors, resulting in 130 KB of storage capacity per disk side on drives equipped with double-density controllers (i.e. not the Atari 810) vs. previous 90 KB. That unusual 130 KB format and was introduced by Atari with the 1050 drive with the introduction of DOS 3.0 in 1983.

A true double-density Atari floppy format (from 180 KB upwards) uses 128-byte sectors for sectors 1-3, then 256-byte sectors for the rest. The first three sectors typically contain boot code as used by the onboard ROM OS; it is up to the resulting boot program (such as SpartaDOS) to recognize the density of the formatted disk structure. While this format was developed by Atari for their DOS 2.0D and their (canceled) 180 KB Atari 815 floppy drive, that double-density DOS was never widely released and the format was generally used by third-party DOS products. Under the Atari DOS II scheme, sector 360 is the VTOC sector map, and sectors 361-367 contain the file listing. The Atari-brand DOS II versions and compatible use three bytes per sector for housekeeping and to link-list to the next sector.

Later, mostly third-party DOS systems added features such as double-sided drives, subdirectories, and drive types such as 720 KB, 1.2 MB, 1.44 MB. Well-known 3rd party Atari DOS products include SmartDOS (distributed with the Rana disk drive), TopDos, MyDos and SpartaDOS.

Commodore Amiga 

The Commodore Amiga computers use an 880 KB format (11×512-byte sectors per track, times 80 tracks, times two sides) on a 3½-inch floppy. Because the entire track is written at once, intersector gaps can be eliminated, saving space.  The Amiga floppy controller is basic but much more flexible than the one on the PC: it is free of arbitrary format restrictions, encoding such as MFM and GCR can be done in software, and developers were able to create their own proprietary disk formats. Because of this, foreign formats such as the IBM PC-compatible can be handled with ease (by use of CrossDOS, which was included with later versions of AmigaOS). With the correct filesystem driver, an Amiga can theoretically read any arbitrary format on the 3½-inch floppy, including those recorded at a slightly different rotation rate. On the PC, however, there is no way to read an Amiga disk without special hardware, such as a Individual Computers Catweasel, and a second floppy drive. Another alternative to read Amiga disk is open source and open hardware project Greaseweazle. It is simple STM32 based USB to FD interface adapter capable of reading magnetic flux image. With proper software, it is possible to read and write Amiga and almost any other floppy disk. 

Commodore never upgraded the Amiga chip set to support high-density floppies, but sold a custom drive (made by Chinon) that spins at half speed (150 RPM) when a high-density floppy was inserted, enabling the existing floppy controller to be used. This drive was built into the Amiga 3000, although the later Amiga 1200 was only fitted with the standard DD drive. The Amiga HD disks can handle 1760 KB, but using special software programs they can hold even more data.  A company named Kolff Computer Supplies also made an external HD floppy drive (KCS Dual HD Drive) available which can handle HD format diskettes on all Amiga computer systems.

Because of storage reasons, the use of emulators and preserving data, many disks were packed into disk images. Currently popular formats are .ADF (Amiga Disk File), .DMS (DiskMasher) and .IPF (Interchangeable Preservation Format) files. The DiskMasher format is copy-protected and has problems storing particular sequences of bits due to bugs in the compression algorithm, but was widely used in the pirate and demo scenes. ADF has been around for almost as long as the Amiga itself though it was not initially called by that name. Only with the advent of the internet and Amiga emulators has it become a popular way of distributing disk images. The proprietary IPF files were created to allow preservation of commercial games which have copy protection, which is something that ADF and DMS cannot do.

The Amiga is also notorious for the clicking sound made by the floppy drive mechanism if no disk is inserted. The purpose is to detect disk changes, and various utilities such as Noclick exist that can disable the clicking noise to the relief of many Amiga users.

Acorn Electron, BBC Micro, and Acorn Archimedes 
The British company Acorn Computers used non-standard disk formats in their 8-bit BBC Micro and Acorn Electron, and their successor the 32-bit Acorn Archimedes. Acorn however, used standard disk controllers: initially FM, though they quickly transitioned to MFM.  The original disk implementation for the BBC Micro stores 100 KB (40 track) or 200 KB (80 track) per side on 5¼-inch disks in a custom format using the Disc Filing System (DFS).

Due to the incompatibility between 40- and 80-track drives, much software was distributed on combined 40/80-track disks. These work by writing the same data in pairs of consecutive tracks in 80-track format, and including a small loader program on track 1 (which is in the same physical position in either format). The loader program detects which type of drive is in use, and loads the main software program straight from disk bypassing the DFS, double-stepping for 80-track drives and single-stepping for 40-track. This effectively achieves downgraded capacity to 100 KB from either disk format, but enabled distributed software to be effectively compatible with either drive.

For their Electron floppy-disk add-on, Acorn chose 3½-inch disks and developed the Advanced Disk Filing System (ADFS). It uses double-density recording and adds the ability to treat both sides of the disk as a single disk. This offers three formats:
 S (small): 160 KB, 40-track single-sided;
 M (medium): 320 KB, 80-track single-sided;
 L (large): 640 KB, 80-track double-sided.

ADFS provides hierarchical directory structure, rather than the flat model of DFS. ADFS also stores some metadata about each file, notably a load address, an execution address, owner and public privileges, and a lock bit. Even on the eight-bit machines, load addresses are stored in 32-bit format, since those machines support 16- and 32-bit coprocessors.

The ADFS format was later adopted into the BBC line upon release of the BBC Master. The BBC Master Compact marked the move to 3½-inch disks, using the same ADFS formats.

The Acorn Archimedes adds D format, which increases the number of objects per directory from 44 to 77 and increases the storage space to 800 KB. The extra space is obtained by using 1024 byte sectors instead of the usual 512 bytes, thus reducing the space needed for inter-sector gaps. As a further enhancement, successive tracks are offset by a sector, giving time for the head to advance to the next track without missing the first sector, thus increasing bulk throughput. The Archimedes uses special values in the ADFS load/execute address metadata to store a 12-bit filetype field and a 40-bit timestamp.

RISC OS 2 introduces E format, which retains the same physical layout as D format, but supports file fragmentation and auto-compaction. Post-1991 machines including the A5000 and Risc PC add support for high-density disks with F format, storing 1,600 KB. However, the PC combo IO chips used are unable to format disks with sector skew, losing some performance. ADFS and the PC controllers also support extra-high density (ED) disks as G format, storing 3,200 KB, but ED drives were never fitted to production machines.

With RISC OS 3, the Archimedes can also read and write disk formats from other machines (for example the Atari ST and the IBM PC, which are largely compatible depending on the ST's OS version). With third-party software it can even read the BBC Micro's original single-density 5¼-inch DFS disks. The Amiga's disks cannot be read by this system as they omitted the usual sector gap markers.

The Acorn filesystem design is interesting to some people because all ADFS-based storage devices connect to a module called FileCore which provides almost all the features required to implement an ADFS-compatible filesystem. Because of this modular design, it is easy in RISC OS 3 to add support for so-called image filing systems. These are used to implement completely transparent support for IBM PC format floppy disks, including the slightly different Atari ST format. Computer Concepts released a package that implements an image filing system to allow access to high density Macintosh format disks.

See also 
 Floppy disk 
 dd (Unix)
 Disk image
 Disk storage
 Don't Copy That Floppy
 Floppy disk controller
 Floppy disk format
 Floppy disk hardware emulator
 Group coded recording
 History of the floppy disk
 List of floppy disk formats
 Sneakernet
 3mode (1.2 MB format on 3.5-inch media)

References

Bibliography 
 .
 .
 Immers, Richard; Neufeld, Gerald G. (1984). Inside Commodore DOS. The Complete Guide to the 1541 Disk Operating System. Data most & Reston (Prentice-Hall). .
 : a detailed essay describing one of the first commercial floppy disk drives.

External links 

 Programming Floppy Disk Controllers
 HowStuffWorks: How Floppy Disk Drives Work
 Computer Hope: Information about computer floppy drives
 NCITS (mention of ANSI X3.162 and X3.171 floppy standards)
 Floppy disk drives and media technical information
 Floppy Disk Formats at the Museum of Obsolete Media
 .

Rotating disc computer storage media
Legacy hardware
American inventions
Floppy disk computer storage